Mychonastes is a genus of green algae, specifically of the Chlorophyceae.

In 2011, Krienitz et al. proposed that Pseudodictyosphaerium be combined with Mychonastes into a single genus; since the latter genus was published earlier in 1978, its name has priority, therefore making Pseudodictyosphaerium a synonym of Mychonastes.

Species
M. afer Krienitz, C.Bock, Dadheech & Proschold, 2011
M. anomalus (Korshikov) Krienitz, C.Bock, Dadheech & Proschold, 2011
M. botrytella (Komárek & Perman) Krienitz, C.Bock, Dadheech & Proschold, 2011
M. densus (Hindák) Krienitz, C.Bock, Dadheech & Proschold, 2011
M. desiccatus S.W.Brown, 1988
M. elegans (Bachmann) Krienitz, C.Bock, Dadheech & Proschold, 2011
M. fluviatilis (Hindák) Krienitz, C.Bock, Dadheech & Proschold, 2011
M. homosphaera (Skuja) Kalina & Puncochárová, 1987
M. huancayensis Krienitz, C.Bock, Dadheech & Proschold, 2011
M. jurisii (Hindák) Krienitz, C.Bock, Dadheech & Proschold, 2011
M. lacunaris (Hindák) Krienitz, C.Bock, Dadheech & Proschold, 2011
M. minusculus (Hindák) Krienitz, C.Bock, Dadheech & Proschold, 2011
M. ovahimbae Krienitz, C.Bock, Dadheech & Proschold, 2011
M. pushpae Krienitz, C.Bock, Dadheech & Proschold, 2011
M. pusillus Krienitz, C.Bock, Dadheech & Proschold, 2011
M. racemosus Krienitz, C.Bock, Dadheech & Proschold, 2011
M. rotundus Krienitz, C.Bock, Dadheech & Proschold, 2011
M. ruminatus P.D.Simpson & S.D.Van Valkenburg, 1978
M. scoticus (Hindák) Krienitz, C.Bock, Dadheech & Proschold, 2011
M. timauensis Krienitz, C.Bock, Dadheech & Proschold, 2011

 M. sp. 5C3
 M. sp. 2C1
 M. sp. 6A3
 M. sp. 5C5
 M. sp. AN 2/29-3
 M. sp. AS 7-9
 M. sp. JL 1/12-12
 M. sp. Tow 6/3 P-1w
 M. sp. YHL/S/PLANKTON10

References

External links

Scientific references

Scientific databases

 AlgaTerra database
 Index Nominum Genericorum

Chlorophyceae genera